The 2013 Trofeo Faip–Perrel was a professional tennis tournament played on hard courts. It was the eight edition of the tournament which was part of the 2013 ATP Challenger Tour. It took place in Bergamo, Italy between 4 and 10 February 2013.

Singles main-draw entrants

Seeds

 1 Rankings are as of January 28, 2013.

Other entrants
The following players received wildcards into the singles main draw:
  Djordje Djokovic
  Ernests Gulbis
  Claudio Grassi
  Andreas Vinciguerra

The following player received entry using a protected ranking:
  Andreas Beck

The following players received entry from the qualifying draw:
  Nikoloz Basilashvili
  Alessandro Bega
  Martin Fischer
  Viktor Galović

The following player received entry as a lucky loser:
  Marco Cecchinato

Doubles main-draw entrants

Seeds

 1 Rankings are as of January 28, 2013.

Other entrants
The following pairs received wildcards into the doubles main draw:
  Farrukh Dustov /  Matteo Volante
  Thomas Fabbiano /  Matteo Trevisan
  Andrea Falgheri /  Stefano Napolitano

The following pair received entry as an alternate:
  Sander Groen /  Andreas Vinciguerra

Champions

Singles

 Michał Przysiężny def.  Jan-Lennard Struff, 4–6, 7–6(7–5), 7–6(7–5)

Doubles

 Karol Beck /  Andrej Martin def.  Claudio Grassi /  Amir Weintraub, 6–3, 3–6, [10–8]

External links
Official Website

Trofeo Faip-Perrel
Trofeo Faip–Perrel